The Arabic word Maqbara ( "mausoleum"; plural:  Maqâbir) is derived from the word Qabr, which means grave. Though maqbara refers to the graves of all Muslims, it refers especially to a Muslim cemetery. In some Islamic cultures (especially Indo-Pak-influenced) it refers also to the graves (Raula or Rauza) of religious figures or Waliyullahs considered to have dedicated their life to Islam, striving to be true Muslims and training others to follow Islam as preached by the Islamic prophet Muhammad.
In Asian countries, maqbara also refers to the Dargah of Waliyullahs, Sufis, Sheikhs, Imams, Qutbs and Ghouses. There are many Dargahs of Waliyullahs all over India, and their maqbaras are found therein.

Madurai Maqbara

In Madurai, South Tamil Nadu, the term maqbara usually refers to the Dargahs of three saints: Meer Ahmad Ibrahim Waliyullah Al Kabir, Meer Amjad Ibrahim Waliyullah As Saghir, and Syed Abdus Salaam Ibrahim Saalim Waliyullah. The graves of all three sheikhs are in the Kazimar big mosque (Periya Pallivasal) in the heart of Madurai city, the cultural capital of Tamil Nadu in South India.

See also
 Khwaja Khizr Tomb
 List of Islamic shrines in Tamil Nadu
 Maqam (shrine)

References

Dargahs in India
Sufi shrines in India
Ziyarat
Buildings and structures in Tamil Nadu
Islam in Tamil Nadu